5 Para A Meia-Noite (5 to Midnight) is a late-night talk show that airs on Thursdays on the Portuguese TV channel RTP1 (formerly on RTP2). Its format is based on several American late-night talk shows.

External links

References

2009 Portuguese television series debuts
Portuguese television talk shows
2000s Portuguese television series